Chewang could refer to the following locations in China:

 Chewang, Hebei (车往镇), town in Wei County, Handan
 Chewang, Cangshan County (车辋镇), town in Shandong
 Chewang, Wudi County (车王镇), town in Shandong
 Chewang, Sichuan (车辋镇), town in Hejiang County